Pnina Werbner (née Gluckman/Gillon, born 3 December 1944- died 17 January 2023) was a British social anthropologist.  Her work has focused on Sufi mysticism, diasporas, Muslim women and public sector unions in Botswana. She has written extensively about the Arab Spring. Werbner is married to anthropologist Richard Werbner, and is the niece of Max Gluckman.

On cultural hybridity Werbner has argued, with particular reference to the Satanic Verses affair and other global cultural conflicts, for the need to recognise the key distinction first coined by Bakhtin between intentional and organic hybridity, in order to understand the Muslim diasporic offence while avoiding futile debates about cultural reification.  In relation to the ‘failure’ of multiculturalism debate she advocates analysing multiculturalism from below, and not merely as a top-down policy.

Since 2000, Werbner has studied the women's movement and the Manual Workers Union in Botswana. Her ethnography, which won an Honorable Mention in 2015 in the Elliot P. Skinner Award from the AAA Association of Africanist Anthropology, analyses the legal mobilisation and struggle for dignity and a living wage of manual public sector workers, both men and women, and traces the evolution of a rooted, working class identity and culture in Botswana, which is both local and cosmopolitan, through cultural performance.

Her work highlights the vernacular, situated cosmopolitanism of rights activists, trade unionists and feminists in the global south, transnational labour migrants and Sufis. She rejects, however, optimistic views of transnationalism as effacing national boundaries, and argues for the need to recognise the illusion of simultaneity, disguising the ruptures that transnational movement engenders.

On diaspora she argues that diasporas are internally heterogeneous, imaginatively constructed, transnational moral communities of co-responsibility. The materiality of diaspora is manifested both affectively and aesthetically, and its members are willing to mobilize politically and economically across borders in response to the sufferings of fellow diasporans or crises in the ‘home’ country.

Werbner is Professor Emerita at Keele University.

Bibliography
 Pilgrims of Love: The Anthropology of a Global Sufi Cult. Indiana University Press, 2003 (Ebook 2017)
 Debating Cultural Hybridity: Multicultural Identities and the Politics of Anti-Racism. Zed Books, 2015
 Political Aesthetics of Global Protest. Edinburgh University Press, 2014
 The Making of an African Working Class: Politics, Law and Cultural Protest in the Manual Workers Union of Botswana. Pluto Press, 2014.
  Anthropology and the New Cosmopolitanism: Rooted, Feminist and Vernacular Perspectives. ASA Monograph No. 45. Bloomsbury, 2008.
 Imagined Diasporas Among Manchester Muslims: The Public Performance of Pakistani Transnational Identity Politics. James Currey, 2002.
 The Migration Process: Capital, Gifts and Offerings among Manchester Pakistanis. 2nd ed. Bloomsbury, 2002.
 Women, Citizenship and Difference. co-edited with Nira Yuval-Davis. Zed Books, 1999. 
 Embodying Charisma: Modernity, Locality and the Performance of Emotion in Sufi Cults. Routledge, 1998.

References

External links
 The Political Aesthetics of Effervescence and Despair, IMMRC/MITRA Lecture Series 2016
 Goodreads Author page
 Cosmopolitanism - in Conversation with Stuart Hall
 Prof. Dr. Pnina Werbner (Keele): Towards a New Cosmopolitanism: Rooted, Feminist and Vernacular Perspectives
 Wenner-Gren Foundation
 "Counting the Anti-Semites"
 "New Arab citizenship and security factors post-Arab Spring"

Social anthropologists
Academics of Keele University
Living people
White South African people
1944 births
British anthropologists
British women anthropologists